Oxalis violacea, the violet wood-sorrel, is a perennial plant and herb in the family Oxalidaceae. Oxalis species are also known as sour grass, sour trefoil, and shamrock.

Description
The three-part leaves have heart-shaped leaflets. The plant is similar in appearance to small clovers such as the shamrock.

Etymology
The genus name, Oxalis, is from the Greek word oxys, which means "sharp" and refers to the sharp or sour taste from the oxalic acid present in the plant. The specific epithet, violacea, is Latin for violet-colored.

Distribution and habitat
It is native plant in much of the United States, from the Rocky Mountains east to the Atlantic Ocean and Gulf of Mexico coasts, and through Eastern Canada.  It has a tendency to cluster in open places in damp woods and on stream banks, and in moist prairies.

Conservation
The plant's conservation status is globally secure; however, it is listed as endangered in Massachusetts and Rhode Island, threatened in New York, and a species of special concern in Connecticut. It is presumed extirpated in Michigan.

Uses

Medicinal
Oxalis violacea was used as a medicinal plant by  Native Americans, including the Cherokee and Pawnee peoples.

Culinary
All parts of the plant are edible – flowers, leaves, stems, and bulb. Oxalis is from the Greek word meaning sour, and this plant has a sour juice.  It is used in salads.  Moderate use of plant is advisable, as it should not be eaten in large quantities due to a high concentration of oxalic acid, ("salt of lemons") which can be poisonous.

It was a traditional food source of the Native American Apache, Cherokee, Omaha, Pawnee, and Ponca peoples.

Cultivation
Oxalis violacea is cultivated as an ornamental plant, for use as a flowering groundcover or perennial plant in traditional and native plant gardens, and for natural landscaping projects. It spreads rapidly by runners and bulbs. In gardens the plant prefers partial shade and moisture.

References

External links

 Flora of Pennsylvania

violacea
Edible plants
Ephemeral plants
Flora of North America
Plants used in Native American cuisine
Plants used in traditional Native American medicine
Endangered flora of the United States
Garden plants of North America
Plants described in 1753
Taxa named by Carl Linnaeus